Jack Garland (1 February 1908 – 29 November 1985) was a boxer born in Belfast, Northern Ireland.

Boxing career

Amateur career
Garland won the 1928 Amateur Boxing Association British bantamweight title, when boxing out of the Gordon Highlanders BC.

He then represented Great Britain in the bantamweight class at the 1928 Summer Olympics. He was eliminated in the quarter-finals of the Games when he lost to that year's gold medalist Vittorio Tamagnini.

1928 Olympic results

 Round of 32: bye
 Round of 16: defeated Ernest Mignard (France) on points
 Quarterfinal: lost to Vittorio Tamagnini (Italy) on points

Professional career
He turned professional in January 1929 and won the Irish featherweight title in 1930. He had his last recorded pro fight in 1935. Notable opponents he met as a pro include Panama Al Brown, Nel Tarleton, Harry Mizler and Nipper Pat Daly.

References

Sources
Madden, Brian. Yesterday's Glovemen: The Golden Days of Ulster Boxing, The Brehon Press, 2006—

External links
 

1908 births
1985 deaths
Male boxers from Northern Ireland
Bantamweight boxers
Featherweight boxers
England Boxing champions
Olympic boxers of Great Britain
Boxers at the 1928 Summer Olympics
Boxers from Belfast
Irish male boxers